The Arizona Revised Statutes (ARS) is the name given to the statutory laws in the state of Arizona. The ARS went into effect on January 9, 1956. It was most recently updated in the first regular session of the 53rd legislature. There are currently 49 titles, although three have been repealed.

West publishes the official West's Arizona Revised Statutes and the Arizona Revised Statutes Annotated. LexisNexis publishes the Arizona Annotated Revised Statutes.

References

External links
Arizona Revised Statutes
Arizona Online Law Reference 

Arizona statutes
United States state legal codes